The following tables contain general and technical information about a number of raster-to-vector conversion software products. Please see the individual products' articles for further information.

General information 
This table gives basic general information about the different vector graphics editors:

Basic features

CAD features

Raster editing features

Vector editing features

Free software 

Inkscape – conversion and creation tool (uses Potrace for raster-to-vector conversion)
librsvg – library used in GNOME, rsvg-convert, rsvg-view, and MediaWiki 
Potrace – cross-platform utility for tracing a bitmap into a smooth, scalable image
SVGcode – progressive web app that uses Potrace
ImageTracer – Public Domain cross-platform raster image to SVG tracing in JavaScript or Java
VTracer – raster to vector graphics converter implemented in Rust

Proprietary software 
Adobe Illustrator
Corel DRAW
Easy Trace
Graphic Tracer Professional
Scan2CAD
WinTopo Freeware - Free to use for any purpose including commercial
WinTopo Pro
Xara Photo & Graphic Designer

Discontinued software 
 Adobe Freehand (1988-2003)
  Adobe Streamline (1989-2001)
 Magic Tracer
 Xara Xtreme for Linux – 2006 open source fork of Xara Photo & Graphic Designer

References 

 
raster to vector software